Movement marketing, or cultural movement marketing, is a marketing model that begins with an idea on the rise in culture. StrawberryFrog, the world's first Cultural Movement agency, invented the movement marketing model in 1999 working for such brands as Smart Car and IKEA.

“Movements” as a new brand building marketing model begins with an idea on the rise in culture rather than the product itself. Scott Goodson, the founder of StrawberryFrog has written that brands can "identify, crystallize, curate and sponsor movements, accelerating their rise."

Definition

Cultural movements is a marketing model that builds brands by identifying, sparking, organizing, leading and/or aligning with an idea on the rise in culture and building a multiplatform communications around this idea so that passionate advocates can belong, rally, engage and bring about change.

Cultural movement" requires a radical rethink of the old rules of marketing.
 
 Instead of being about “the individual” it is about the group
 Instead of being about persuading people to believe something, it is about understanding & tapping into what they already believe
 Instead of being about selling, it is about sharing
 Perhaps most radical of all, it requires advertisers to stop talking about themselves – and to join in a conversation that is about anything and everything but the product

StrawberryFrog defines the cultural movement model as having five phases:

 Strategy
 Declaration
 Provocation
 Go MASSive
 Sustainability

Examples
A pioneer in cultural movement marketing model is Apple. Large companies applying this model currently include Mahindra, PepsiCo, and Procter & Gamble.

References
 https://web.archive.org/web/20100917104242/http://www.mediapost.com/publications/?fa=Articles.showArticle&art_aid=135834 
 
 
 
 

Types of marketing